Eurobandið (Euroband) is the name of Icelandic technopop and dance duo Friðrik Ómar and Regína Ósk, who together represented Iceland at the Eurovision Song Contest 2008 in Belgrade, Serbia. They performed the song "This Is My Life" in the second semi-final, on 22 May 2008 which won them a place in the final on May 24. They finished 14th out of 25 in the final with 64 points.

They have both, separately, established themselves as popular artists in Iceland and have tried to represent Iceland in Eurovision before as separate acts, but were unsuccessful. It was not until they joined that Iceland chose them as their representative in the Eurovision Song Contest 2008.

References

Eurovision Song Contest entrants for Iceland
Eurovision Song Contest entrants of 2008
Icelandic pop music groups